The 1995 Detroit Lions season was the team's 66th in the National Football League (NFL). Finishing at 10–6, it marked the Lions' third consecutive winning season, which had not been accomplished in Detroit since the team posted four consecutive winning seasons from 1969 to 1972.

It was also the Lions' third consecutive postseason appearance, and fourth in five seasons – the franchise’s best era since the 1950s.

The Lions started the season 0–3 and were 3–6 after a Week 10 loss in Atlanta. However, starting with a Week 11 win over Tampa Bay, the Lions won a franchise-record seven consecutive games to close out the season and clinch a playoff berth.

Herman Moore had a career season as he broke Cris Carter’s NFL record for most receptions in a season (123). Moore and teammate Brett Perriman (108 catches) became the first receiver duo to each have more than 100 receptions in the same season.

The Lions' 436 points scored was the most in franchise history until it was eclipsed by the 2011 team.

For the third consecutive year, however, the Lions could not win a playoff game and were eliminated as they were routed by the Philadelphia Eagles 58-37 in the Wild Card playoffs after falling behind 51–7. Leading up to their Wild Card game, Detroit offensive linemen Lomas Brown guaranteed a victory over the Eagles.

The last remaining active member of the 1995 Detroit Lions was kicker Jason Hanson, who retired after the 2012 season.

Offseason

NFL Draft 

Notes

 Detroit traded its second-round selection (51st) to San Diego in exchange for the Chargers' first-round selection in 1996.
 Detroit traded up from its third-round selection (82nd) with St. Louis for the Rams' second-round selection (70th), giving up its fourth-round selection (115th).
 Detroit received Seattle's fifth-round selection (141st) in exchange for WR Reggie Barrett.
 Detroit received San Francisco's fifth-round selection (163rd) in exchange for RB Derrick Moore.

Personnel

Staff

Roster

Regular season

Schedule

Season summary

Week 13 

    
    
    
    
    
    
    
    
    
    
    
    
    
    

 Scott Mitchell 30/45, 410 Yds
 Barry Sanders 24 Rush, 138 Yds
 Herman Moore 12 Rec, 153 Yds
 Brett Perriman 8 Rec, 127 Yds
 Johnnie Morton 7 Rec, 102 Yds

Standings

Playoffs

NFC Wild Card Game: At Philadelphia Eagles 

The Eagles scored 31 points in the second quarter, recorded six interceptions, forced seven total turnovers and held future Hall of Fame running back Barry Sanders to just 40 rushing yards en route to a 58–37 victory in the second highest scoring game in NFL postseason history, which was also the first occasion the Lions had played the Eagles since 1986. The two teams combined for 874 total yards of offense.

Awards and honors 
 Scott Mitchell, Thanksgiving Day Record, Most passing yards by a Lions quarterback, 410 yards
 Herman Moore, Single Season Record, Most Receptions in a Season
 Barry Sanders, All-Pro
 Barry Sanders, NFC Pro Bowl Selection

Milestones 
 Barry Sanders, 7th consecutive 1000 yard season
 Herman Moore, 100 reception season,

References

External links 
 1995 Detroit Lions at Pro-Football-Reference.com

Detroit
Detroit Lions seasons
Detroit Lions